Jung Min-mu  (born 3 March 1985) is a South Korean football player who plays for the Goyang Hi FC in K League Challenge.

Career
Jung joined Ulsan Hyundai Mipo in 2005. In 2010, he left the team and joined the army to start his military duty.

He signed with Ansan H FC after finishing his duty in 2012.

References

External links 

1985 births
Living people
South Korean footballers
Association football forwards
Ulsan Hyundai Mipo Dockyard FC players
Goyang Zaicro FC players
Korea National League players
K League 2 players